Marshal General Jean-de-Dieu Soult, 1st Duke of Dalmatia, (29 March 1769 – 26 November 1851) was a French general and statesman, named Marshal of the Empire in 1804 and often called Marshal Soult. Soult was one of only six officers in French history to receive the distinction of Marshal General of France. The Duke also served three times as President of the Council of Ministers, or Prime Minister of France.

Soult played a key role as a corps commander in many of Napoleon's campaigns, most notably at Austerlitz, where his corps delivered the decisive attack that won the battle. Later, Soult's intrigues in the Peninsular War while occupying Portugal earned him the nickname, "King Nicolas", and while he was Napoleon's military governor of Andalusia, Soult looted 1.5 million francs worth of art. One historian called him "a plunderer in the world class." He was defeated in his last offensives in Spain in the Battle of the Pyrenees (Sorauren) and by Freire's Spaniards at San Marcial. Soult was eventually pursued out of Spain and onto French soil, where he was maneuvered out of several positions at Nivelle, Nive, and Orthez, before the Battle of Toulouse.

Soult was also responsible for the creation of the French Foreign Legion on March 9, 1831.

Early life
Soult was born in Saint-Amans-la-Bastide (now called Saint-Amans-Soult in his honor, near Castres, in the Tarn department) and named after John of God. He was the son of a country notary named Jean Soult (1726–1779) by his marriage to Brigitte, daughter of Pierre François de Grenier de Lapierre. He was a catholic.

Jean-de-Dieu Soult was expected to have a promising career as a lawyer. However, on April 16, 1785, at the age of sixteen, he enlisted as a private in the Royal-Infanterie regiment, to help his mother financially after the death of his father. His younger brother, Pierre-Benoît Soult, followed his example three years later, and would also become a French general.

Revolutionary Wars

Jean Soult fought in the wars of Revolutionary France. Soult's superior education ensured his promotion to the rank of sergeant after six years of service, and in July 1791 he became instructor to the first battalion of volunteers of the Bas-Rhin. On January 17, 1792, his colonel appointed him instructor in the 1st battalion of Haut-Rhin volunteers, with the rank of second lieutenant (sous-lieutenant). The war period, which began in April 1792, offered him many opportunities to stand out and he rose through the ranks with regularity. Adjutant-major on July 16, 1792, captain on August 20, 1793, provisional adjutant to the staff of General Lazare Hoche to the Army of the Moselle on November 19, 1793. He took part in the Battle of Kaiserslautern from November 28 to 30, which allowed the recapture of Wissembourg and the relief of Landau. Hoche gives Soult the command of a detached body to take Marsthal's camp, a task which was brilliantly executed.

From December 26 to 29, he was present at the Second Battle of Wissembourg. He was appointed chief of staff of the avant-garde on January 27, 1794, provisional battalion commander on February 7, 1794, titular battalion commander on April 3, and adjutant-general brigade chief (adjudant-général chef de brigade) on May 14. On March 19, 1794, the Army of the Moselle was replaced by the Army of the Rhine under the command of General Jean-Baptiste Jourdan. This army immediately returns to the campaign. Two battles were fought in Arlon on April 17, 18 and 29, then on May 21, in which Soult took an active part.

After the Battle of Fleurus of 1794, in which he distinguished himself for coolness, he joined the Army of Sambre and Meuse on June 28. Soult was promoted to brigadier general by the representatives on mission. For the next five years, Soult was employed in Germany under Generals Jean-Baptiste Jourdan (a veteran of the American War of Independence and a future Marshal), Jean Victor Marie Moreau, Jean-Baptiste Kléber and François Lefebvre (also a future Marshal). He took part in the Battle of Aldenhoven on October 2, 1794. He moved to Jacques Hatry's division and took part in the Siege of Luxembourg from November 22 to June 7, 1795. He took a brilliant part in the battles of Altenkirchen on June 4, 1796, of Friedberg on July 10, 1796, and in the Battle of Stockach against the army of Charles of Austria on March 25, 1799. The rank of division general is attributed to him on April 4, 1799, on a provisional basis, and it is confirmed on the following April 21.

Soult passed to the Army of Helvetia under the orders of General André Masséna (another future Marshal). It was at this time that he built the bases of his military reputation, in particular during the First Battle of Zurich of June 2–5, 1799; then he subdued the insurgent cantons, drove the rebels on the Reuss and drove them back to in the valley of Urseren - relieving Frauenfeld, Altikon, Audelfinden. He obtains a citation on the order of the day of June 2, 1799. On the 10 of the same month, he hunts down, at the head of the 110th Demi-Brigade, the Austrians, occupying Mount Albis. Cross the Linth River on September 22, Soult leads the enemy to suffer a loss of 4,000 men, then he comes to meet the Russians who advance on Kaltbrunn, forcing the surrender of a body of 2,000 men, seized Weesen and pushed the enemy back to Lake Constance.

Consulate Era 
When in 1800 the First Consul Napoleon Bonaparte entrusted Masséna to reorganize the Army of Italy, he insisted that Soult be his deputy; giving him the command of the right wing.

Soult distinguished himself for his active part in the defense of the country of Genoa. On April 6, in an initial sortie, at the head of several battalions, he crossed the Austrian army and relieved General Gardanne. The enemy was repulsed beyond Piotta, and Soult pursued General Suvorov into the Alps, seizing Sassello and returning to Genoa with numerous prisoners, cannons, and flags. During another sortie, the general pushed in against the Austrian army, trapping a division at Monte-Facio. But, during a fight in Montecreto on 13 April 1800, a gunshot shattered his leg; laying on the battlefield wounded, he was robbed and taken prisoner, spending days in agony in a filthy hospital. This experience traumatized Soult, and he would never again place himself so forward in the battleline.

He was rescued after the victory at Marengo on June 14, 1800. Appointed military commander of Piedmont, then in the midst of a rebellion, Soult managed to put down the so-called Barbets insurrection. He even managed to discipline the rowdy hordes and use them for his service. Soult then received command of the southern part of the Kingdom of Naples.

Shortly before the Treaty of Amiens, General Soult returned to Paris, where the First Consul welcomed him with the highest distinction. On March 5, 1802, he was one of the four generals called to command the Consular Guard with the post of colonel general. He thereafter pledged allegiance to the new regime. In August 1803, Soult was entrusted with the command-in-chief of the Camp of Boulogne. Soult, a former drill instructor, imposed a rigorous discipline there, which ensured the effectiveness of French troops during future campaigns, and also earned him the nickname "Bras de Fer" ("Iron Arm"). Even Napoleon wondered if he was being too severe, to which assertions Soult replied:"Those who can't handle what I myself endure will be left behind in the depots. Those that can will be fit to conquer the world."

Napoleonic Wars

Marshal of the Empire

In May 1804, Soult was made one of the first eighteen Marshals of the Empire. He commanded a corps in the advance on Ulm, and at Austerlitz he led the decisive attack on the Allied centre.

Soult played a great part in many of the famous battles of the Grande Armée, including the Battle of Austerlitz in 1805 and the Battle of Jena in 1806. However, he was not present at the Battle of Friedland because on that same day he was capturing Königsberg. After the conclusion of the Treaties of Tilsit, he returned to France and in 1808 was anointed by Napoleon as 1st Duke of Dalmatia (French: Duc de Dalmatie). The awarding of this honour greatly displeased him, for he felt that his title should have been Duke of Austerlitz, a title which Napoleon had reserved for himself. In the following year, Soult was appointed as commander of the II Corps with which Napoleon intended to conquer Spain. After winning the Battle of Gamonal, Soult was detailed by the emperor to pursue Lieutenant-General Sir John Moore's British army. At the Battle of Coruña, in which Moore was killed, Soult failed to prevent British forces escaping by sea.

Peninsular War

For the next four years, Soult remained in Spain engaged in the Peninsular War. In 1809, he invaded Portugal and took Porto, but was isolated by General Francisco da Silveira's strategy of contention. Busying himself with the political settlement of his conquests in French interests and, as he hoped, for his own ultimate benefit as a possible candidate for the Portuguese throne, he attracted the hatred of Republican officers in his army. Unable to move, he was eventually driven from Portugal in the Second Battle of Porto by Lieutenant-General Sir Arthur Wellesley (later made Duke of Wellington), making a painful and almost disastrous retreat over the mountains, pursued by General William Beresford and Silveira. After the Battle of Talavera, Soult was made chief of staff of French forces in Spain with extended powers, and on 19 November 1809, won a great victory at the Battle of Ocana.

In 1810, he invaded Andalusia, which he quickly overran. However, because he then turned to seize Seville, the capture of Cádiz eluded him, saying, "Give me Seville and I will answer for Cádiz." This led to the prolonged and futile Siege of Cadiz, a strategic disaster for the French. In 1811, Soult marched north into Extremadura and took Badajoz. When the Anglo-Portuguese army laid siege to the city, he marched to its rescue and fought and nearly won the famous and bloody Battle of Albuera on 16 May.

In 1812, after Wellington's great victory at Salamanca, Soult was obliged to evacuate Andalusia. In the subsequent Siege of Burgos, he was able to drive Wellington's Anglo-allied Army back to Salamanca. There, the Duke of Dalmatia, as Soult was now known, failed to attack Wellington despite superiority in numbers, and the British Army retired to the Portuguese frontier. Soon after, he was recalled from Spain at the request of Joseph Bonaparte (who had been installed by his brother as King of Spain) with whom, as with the other marshals, he had always disagreed.

In Germany and defending southern France
In March 1813, Soult assumed command of the IV Corps of the Grande Armée and commanded the centre at Lützen and Bautzen, but he was soon sent, with unlimited powers, to the South of France to repair the damage done by the defeat at Vitoria. It is to Soult's credit that he was able to reorganise the demoralised French forces.

His last offensives into Spain were turned back by Wellington in the Battle of the Pyrenees (Sorauren) and by General Manuel Freire's Spaniards at San Marcial. Pursued onto French soil, Soult was maneuvered out of several positions at Nivelle, Nive, and Orthez, before suffering what was technically a defeat at Wellington's hands at the Battle of Toulouse. He nevertheless inflicted severe casualties on Wellington and was able to stop him from trapping the French forces.

Hundred Days and Waterloo
After Napoleon's first abdication in 1814, Soult declared himself a royalist, received the Order of Saint Louis, and acted as Minister of War from 26 November 1814 to 11 March 1815. When Napoleon returned from Elba, Soult at once declared himself a Bonapartist, was made a peer of France, and acted as chief of staff to the emperor during the Waterloo campaign, in which role he distinguished himself far less than he had done as commander of an over-matched army.

In his book, Waterloo: The History of Four Days, Three Armies and Three Battles, Bernard Cornwell summarizes the opinions of several historians that Soult's presence in the Army of the North was one of several factors contributing to Napoleon's defeat, because of the animosity between him and Marshal Michel Ney, the other senior commander, and because, in spite of his experience as a soldier, Soult lacked his predecessor Marshal Louis-Alexandre Berthier's administrative skills. The most glaring instance of this was his written order, according to Napoleon's instructions, to Marshal Emmanuel de Grouchy to position his force on the British Army's left flank in order to prevent reinforcement by the Prussians. Cornwell decries the wording of Soult's order as "almost impenetrable nonsense", and Grouchy misinterpreted the order, instead marching against the Prussian rearguard at Wavre.

Political career 
Following the Second Bourbon Restoration in 1815, Soult went into exile in Germany, but in 1819 he was recalled and in 1820 again made a Marshal of France. He once more tried to show himself as a fervent royalist and was made a peer in 1827. After the revolution of 1830 he declared himself a partisan of Louis Philippe, who welcomed his support and revived for him the title of Marshal General of France, previously held only by Turenne, Claude Louis Hector de Villars, and Maurice de Saxe.

Creation of the French Foreign Legion 
As Minister of War (1830 to 1834), Soult organized and oversaw the rearmament of the French military. The strength of the Army of the Restoration numbered only a little over 200,000 men and Soult sought to double its size, carrying the necessary reforms from 1831 to 1832. The first law of this important military reform was that creating the Foreign Legion, on 9 March 1831; a force of foreign volunteers which could only be used outside the territory of metropolitan France, especially aimed at garrisoning the recently conquered Algiers. The Legion, when created, was loathed by the army and considered a lower posting; the force being colloquially called as the "Bastard of Soult".

Military reforms 

Louis-Philippe, worried about having to rely solely on the National Guard to maintain public order, instructed Marshal Soult to reorganize the line army without delay. Soult wrote a report to the king, presented to the Chamber of Deputies on February 20, 1831, in which he criticized the recruitment Gouvion-Saint-Cyr law of 1818: the voluntary system combined with the drawing of ballots and the possibility of being replaced had not made it possible to increase the number of manpower sufficiently, and that the promotion procedures helped to maintain over-staffing. Soult proposed the main lines of a military policy aimed at increasing the army's strength, reducing said over-staffing and ensuring the supply of arms and ammunition.

Following the creation of the Legion on 9 March, Soult passed the laws of April 11, 1831 on military pensions, of March 21 and April 14, 1832, on army recruitment and promotion, and of May 19, 1834 on the status of officers. Soult also oversaw the construction of the fortifications of Paris. In 1831, he was sent by Louis-Philippe to Lyon with 20,000 men to crush the first insurrection of the city's silk workers, the canuts. Order is restored, but Soult becomes very unpopular within the Republican camp. In his play Napoléon Bonaparte ou Trente ans de l'histoire de France (Napoleon Bonaparte or Thirty Years of the History of France), Dumas Père represents him in a dreadful appearance during the Hundred Days.

In 1834, when a new insurrection broke out in April in Lyon, Marshal Soult received from Lieutenant-General Aymar, commander of the troops in the city, a desperate telegraphic dispatch about evacuating the city. The Duke of Dalmatia's firm response was not long in coming, chastising the general and ordering him to hold all his positions and to man the walls and be buried beneath them.

Prime Minister 

While he was Minister of War, he held the presidency of the Council of Ministers (or Prime Minister) for the first time in 1832–1834. France being the guarantor of the Treaty of the XXIV articles, he had the Antwerp expedition carried out by Marshal Gérard, who seized the city after heroic resistance from the Dutch (December 1832) and returned it to Belgium, its country of attribution.

In April 1838, Louis-Philippe chose Soult to represent him at the coronation of Queen Victoria. He received a triumphant welcome in London – where his former enemy, the Duke of Wellington, reputedly caught him by the arm and exclaimed "I have you at last!"

Once again at the head of the government (1839-1840), he was at the same time the holder of the Foreign Affairs portfolio. He participated in the ceremonies for returning the ashes of Napoleon in December 1840.

President of the Council for almost seven years, from 1840 to 1847, he left the effective management of the Cabinet to his Minister of Foreign Affairs, François Guizot, who logically succeeded him when he left the government, for health reasons. For five years (1840-1845), he combined his function with that of Minister of War. On September 26, 1847, Louis-Philippe restored for him the honorary dignity of Marshal General of the king's camps and armies, however modifying this title into the unique Marshal General of France.

In 1848, Soult declared himself a republican. He died three years later in his castle in Soult-Berg, near Saint-Amans-la-Bastide where he was born, a few days before the coup of 1851. In his honor, the town was renamed Saint-Amans-Soult in December 1851. He is one of the eighteen Marshals of the Empire (out of twenty-six) who belonged to Freemasonry.

Works
Soult published a memoir justifying his adherence to Napoleon during the Hundred Days, and his notes and journals were arranged by his son Napoleon Hector, who published the first part Mémoires du maréchal-général Soult (Memories of Marshal-General Soult) in 1854. Le Noble's Mémoires sur les operations des Français en Galicie (Memories of the Operations of the French in Galicia) are supposed to have been written from Soult's papers.

Military capability

Although often found wanting tactically – even some of his own aides questioned his inability to amend a plan to take into account altered circumstances on the battlefield – Soult's performance in the closing months of the Peninsular War is often regarded as proof of his fine talents as a general. Repeatedly defeated in these campaigns by the Allies under Wellington, it was the case that many of his soldiers were raw conscripts while the Allies could count greater numbers of veterans among their ranks. Soult was a skillful military strategist. An example was his drive to cut off Wellington's British army from Portugal after Talavera, which nearly succeeded. Though repeatedly defeated by Wellington in 1813–1814, he conducted a clever defence against him.

Soult's armies were usually well readied before going into battle. After Vitoria, he reorganized the demoralized French forces of Joseph Bonaparte into a formidable army in a remarkably short time. An exception to this good logistical record was launching the Battle of the Pyrenees offensive when his soldiers only had four days' rations.
Tactically, Soult planned his battles well, but often left too much to his subordinates. Wellington said that "Soult never seemed to know how to handle troops after a battle had begun". An example of this was at the Battle of Albuera, where he brilliantly turned Beresford's flank to open the battle, yet when he found himself facing unexpected opposition from British and Spanish troops, he allowed his generals to adopt a clumsy attack formation and was beaten. Another example of his strengths and weaknesses can be seen at the Battle of the Nive. Soult recognized Wellington's strategic dilemma and took advantage by launching surprise attacks on both wings of the Anglo-Allied Army. But French tactical execution was poor and the British general managed to fend off Soult's blows. Sloppy staff work marred his tenure as Napoleon's chief of staff in the Waterloo campaign.

In the early twentieth the British named the Royal Navy monitor HMS Marshal Soult after him.

Marriage and children
On 26 April 1796, Soult married Johanna Louise Elisabeth Berg (1771–1852), the daughter of Johann Abraham Berg (1730–1786) by his marriage to Wilhelmine Mumm in Solingen. She died at the Château de Soult-Berg on 22 March 1852. The couple had three children:
 Napoléon (1802–1857), 2nd Duke of Dalmatia, who died without male heir, at which time the title became extinct
 Hortense (1804–1862)
 Caroline (1817–1817)

Footnotes

Sources
 Glover, Michael. The Peninsular War 1807–1814. London: Penguin, 2001. 
 Chandler, David (ed.). Griffith, Paddy. Napoleon's Marshals, "Soult: King Nicolas." New York: Macmillan, 1987. 
  That article, in turn, references:
 A. Salle, Vie politique du maréchal Soult (Paris, 1834)
 A. de Grozelier, Le Maréchal Soult (Castres, 1851)
 A. Combes, Histoire anecdotique du maréchal Soult (Castres, 1869).

Further reading
 Bukhari, Emir: Napoleon's Marshals. Osprey Publishing, 1979, .
 Chandler, David: Napoleon's Marshals. Macmillan Pub Co, 1987, .
 Connelly, Owen: Blundering to Glory: Napoleon's Military Campaigns. SR Books, 1999, .
 Elting, John R.: Swords Around a Throne: Napoleon's Grande Armée. Weidenfeld & Nicolson, 1997, 
 Gotteri, Nicole: Soult: Maréchal d'Empire et homme d'État. Besançon: La Manufacture, 1991. 
 Hayman, Peter: Soult: Napoleon's Maligned Marshall. Sterling Pub, 1990, .
 Haythornthwaite, Philip: Napoleon's Commanders (2): c.1809–15. Osprey Publishing, 2002, 
 Humble, Richard: Napoleon's Peninsular marshals: A reassessment. Taplinger Pub., 1975, 0800854659
 Linck, Tony: Napoleon's Generals. Combined Publishing, 1994, 
 Macdonell, A. G.: Napoleon and His Marshals. Prion, 1997,

External links 

 The bloody battle of Heilsberg, 1807. Napoleon and Soult vs Bennigsen.
Records of artwork belonging to Soult, University of Birmingham

1769 births
1851 deaths
Commanders in the French Imperial Guard
Dukes of Dalmatia
French military personnel of the French Revolutionary Wars
French Ministers of War
Knights of the Golden Fleece
Marshals General of France
Marshals of the First French Empire
Members of the Chamber of Peers of the Bourbon Restoration
Members of the Chamber of Peers of the Hundred Days
People from Tarn (department)
Politicians from Occitania (administrative region)
Politicians of the July Monarchy
Prime Ministers of France
Names inscribed under the Arc de Triomphe